Super Star is a fairground ride once manufactured by Northern Amusements (NA Superides).

The construction of the ride involves a single boom arm which twists around its own axle, lifting a spinning frame of 8 main arms with a 4-person seat gondola.  In the rear of the gondola there is a hydraulic ram which pulls the seating units into an outward position. Once in this position the riders will be at a 90 degree angle when the ride is lifted to its 45 degree position. A safety system will then engage at the bottom of the ride to prevent the gondola from coming down in the event of an emergency.

When the ride is in its elevated position, the operator has the choice of rotating the main boom clockwise, or anti-clockwise. On some Super Stars, the boom can be lowered while the ride is in the fully inverted position. This form of operation is only used on one Super Star worldwide. The ride is packed onto one semi-trailer and has a fairly quick build-up time.

Super Star rides are capable of having a complete back-flash fitted with airbrushed artwork and neon lighting.

The Super Star is loosely related to the Move-It.

Amusement rides
Upside-down amusement rides